Anatrachyntis centropecta is a moth in the family Cosmopterigidae. It was described by Edward Meyrick in 1931, and is known from Peninsular Malaysia.

References

Moths described in 1931
Anatrachyntis
Moths of Asia